Graeme Martin, OAM is an Australian Paralympic sailor.

Biography
Martin was born on 11 March 1949 in Perth, Western Australia. Formerly a firefighter, his left leg was amputated after an accident that occurred while he was fighting a fire caused by arson at a winery in the Perth suburb of Caversham. In 2000, he won the North American championship for disabled persons in St. Petersburg, Florida with Noel Robins and Jamie Dunross, in preparation for the 2000 Sydney Games. At the Games, he won a gold medal with Robins and Dunross in the Mixed Three Person Sonar event, for which he received a Medal of the Order of Australia. This gold medal achievement was initially the only medal ever won by Australian sailors at the Games. At the 2008 Beijing Games, he won a bronze medal in the Mixed Three Person Sonar event. At these Games, Martin competed alongside 2 other athletes; Russell Boaden and Colin Harrison.

In 2020, Martin along with Noel Robins and Jamie Dunross were inducted into the Australian Sailing Hall of Fame.

References

Australian male sailors (sport)
Paralympic sailors of Australia
Sailors at the 2000 Summer Paralympics
Sailors at the 2008 Summer Paralympics
Paralympic gold medalists for Australia
Paralympic bronze medalists for Australia
Amputee category Paralympic competitors
Recipients of the Medal of the Order of Australia
Living people
Medalists at the 2000 Summer Paralympics
Medalists at the 2008 Summer Paralympics
1949 births
Paralympic medalists in sailing